Podothecus sturioides is a fish in the family Agonidae. It was described by Alphone Guichenot in 1869.

References

sturioides
Taxa named by Alphonse Guichenot
Fish described in 1869